Liang Chengfu (died 26 June 1865) was an eminent military leader of the Taiping Rebellion, and known during his military tenure as the King of Qi (啟王). He led Taiping forces to many military victories especially at Hubei and Shaanxi in central and northwest China. He was awarded the E An in 1860. Liang was an important general for late-Taiping and broke out the Hubei Pocket in August 1864 till 1865. He later joined in the Nien Rebellion and was executed by Viceroy of Sichuan Luo Bingzhang after interrogation in 1865.

Wins
Western Front
Battle of Guanzhong (1861)
Hubei Pocket (1864)

Loss
Defended the Longnan from  September 1864 to 6 June 1865 and was arrested.

1865 deaths
Military leaders of the Taiping Rebellion
Executed Taiping Heavenly Kingdom people
People from Yulin, Guangxi
1820 births
People executed by the Qing dynasty
Executed people from Guangxi
Nian Rebellion